Warwick and Leamington is a constituency represented in the House of Commons of the UK Parliament since the 2017 general election by Matt Western, of the Labour Party.

Members of Parliament

Constituency profile
The seat comprises the two eponymous towns, with modest hills surrounding them, in the upper valley of the River Avon.

The towns of Warwick and Royal Leamington Spa are still distinct, however, and form, in the modern seat, a contiguous urban area. Both towns are relatively affluent, although there are pockets of deprivation in Leamington. Warwick, with its historic castle, is an internationally advertised tourist destination, while Leamington's economy is more dependent on storage, distribution, manufacturing, processing, engineering and industry. Leamington is also more ethnically diverse (e.g. five per cent of the constituency's population is of Asian ethnicity) and is home to some students of the University of Warwick that lies close to Coventry.

Unemployment claimants who were registered jobseekers were in November 2012 significantly lower than the national average of 3.8%, at 2.2% of the population based on a statistical compilation by The Guardian.

Boundaries

2010–present: The District of Warwick wards of Bishop's Tachbrook, Brunswick, Budbrooke, Clarendon, Crown, Manor, Milverton, Warwick North, Warwick South, Warwick West, Whitnash, and Willes. The 2010 boundary changes reduced the constituency's area by removing outlying villages, reflecting population and housing growth.

1997–2010: The District of Warwick wards of Bishop's Tachbrook, Brunswick, Budbrooke, Clarendon, Crown, Cubbington, Lapworth, Leek Wootton, Manor, Milverton, Radford Semele, Warwick North, Warwick South, Warwick West, Whitnash, and Willes, and the District of Stratford-on-Avon wards of Henley, Tanworth, and Tanworth Earlswood.

1983–1997: The District of Warwick wards of Bishop's Tachbrook, Brunswick, Budbrooke, Clarendon, Crown, Cubbington, Lapworth, Leek Wootton, Manor, Milverton, Radford Semele, Warwick North, Warwick South, Warwick West, Whitnash, and Willes.

1974–1983: As 1950 but with redrawn boundaries.

1950–1974: The Boroughs of Warwick and Royal Leamington Spa, the Urban District of Kenilworth, and the Rural District of Warwick.

1918–1950: The Boroughs of Warwick, Royal Leamington Spa, and Stratford-on-Avon, the Urban District of Kenilworth, the Rural Districts of Warwick and Alcester, and parts of the Rural Districts of Stratford-on-Avon and Brailes.

1885-1918: The existing parliamentary borough of Warwick, the municipal borough of Royal Leamington Spa, and the local government districts of Milverton and Lillington.

History
The constituency was created under the Redistribution of Seats Act 1885, partially replacing the earlier and ancient Warwick constituency which until that year had sent two MPs to Westminster.

Political history
Represented by Conservatives from 1910 to 1997, the seat was for much of this time a safe seat, seeing frequent majorities of more than 10,000 votes, and the seat was uncontested in both 1918 and 1922. The seat had not been expected to change hands in the 1997 general election: as such James Plaskitt's defeat of Dudley Smith was a Portillo moment, without the decapitation of a government frontbencher. Plaskitt increased his majority in the 2001 election, but on a lower turnout. In the 2005 election, Warwick and Leamington was 85th on the Conservative list of target seats, meaning that to gain it they would have required a somewhat greater swing than was seen nationally. With a greater swing from Labour to the Liberal Democrats, Plaskitt narrowly held the seat with a majority slashed from nearly 6,000 votes to only 266.

However, minor boundary changes in Labour's favour took effect at the 2010 general election and the winner was variously predicted. In the event the seat was gained by a Conservative, Chris White, with a majority of 7% of the vote. On this occasion the Conservative Party was the main beneficiary from swings away from the Labour Party and the Green Party. White held the seat in 2015 with an increased majority of 6,606. Labour's Matthew Western won the seat from the Conservatives on a swing of 7.6% in the 2017 election, overturning a 6,606 vote lead (this was the 4th biggest lead overturned by Labour at this election). This made Matt Western just the second Labour MP for Warwick and Leamington in the seat's history. In 2019, Western held the seat with a slightly reduced majority.

Prominent members
From 1923 to 1957, the seat was represented by Anthony Eden, who was Prime Minister from 1955 to 1957.

For part of the early 1920s, the Solicitor General for England and Wales, then Attorney General for England and Wales, represented the seat, Sir Ernest Pollock. Eden's successor, Sir John Hobson, was also in all of those senior positions for part of the early 1960s.

Elections

Elections in the 2010s

Elections in the 2000s

Elections in the 1990s

Elections in the 1980s

Elections in the 1970s

Elections in the 1960s

Elections in the 1950s

Election in the 1940s

General Election 1939–40:
Another General Election was required to take place before the end of 1940. The political parties had been making preparations for an election to take place from 1939 and by the end of this year, the following candidates had been selected; 
Conservative: Anthony Eden
Liberal: Walter Dingley
Labour: Theodore Besterman

Elections in the 1930s

Elections in the 1920s

Elections in the 1910s

Elections in the 1900s

Elections in the 1890s

 Caused by Peel's elevation to the peerage, becoming Viscount Peel.

Elections in the 1880s

See also
 List of parliamentary constituencies in Warwickshire

Notes

References

External links
 Richard Kimber's Political Science Resources: UK General Elections since 1832
 1968 By Election Results
 1957 By Election Results
 Catalogue of the Warwick and Leamington Constituency Labour Party archives, held at the Modern Records Centre, University of Warwick

Warwick
Leamington Spa
Parliamentary constituencies in Warwickshire
Constituencies of the Parliament of the United Kingdom established in 1885
Constituencies of the Parliament of the United Kingdom represented by a sitting Prime Minister